In modern usage,  (hijab) generally refers to the various headcoverings frequently worn by Muslim women. Wearing hijab is mandatory in some Muslim countries, and optional or restricted in other majority Muslim and majority non-Muslim countries. In the Indonesian Aceh province, Muslim women are required to wear the hijab and all women are required to do so regardless of religion in Iran and Afghanistan. In countries such as Saudi Arabia, the hijab is not required. Meanwhile, in Gaza, Palestinian school officials have voted to require young girls to wear hijab, while Palestinian jihadists belonging to the Unified Leadership (UNLU) have rejected a hijab policy for women. They have also targeted those who seek to impose the hijab. 

Kosovo (since 2009), Azerbaijan (since 2010), Tunisia (since 1981, partially lifted in 2011) and Turkey (gradually and partially lifted) are the only Muslim-majority countries which have banned the burqa in public schools and universities or government buildings. In some Muslim majority countries (like Lebanon, Morocco, and Tunisia) there have been complaints of restriction or discrimination against women who wear the hijab. The hijab in these cases is seen as fundamentalism against secular government.

In several countries in Europe, meanwhile, the adherence to the hijab has led to political controversies and proposals for a legal ban. Laws have been passed in France and Belgium to ban face-covering clothing, popularly described as the "burqa ban", although it does not only apply to the hijab.

Other countries are debating similar legislation, or have more limited prohibitions. Some of them apply only to face-covering clothing such as the burqa, boushiya, or niqāb, while other legislation pertains to any clothing with an Islamic religious symbolism such as the khimar. Some countries already have laws banning the wearing of masks in public, which can be applied to veils that conceal the face. The issue has different names in different countries, and "the veil" or hijab may be used as general terms for the debate, representing more than just the veil itself, or the concept of modesty embodied in hijab.

Since 2005, France has banned overt religious symbols, including many religious headcoverings, in public schools and government buildings. 

Although Muslims are present throughout Europe and have been established for many centuries, most Muslims in Western Europe are members of immigrant communities. The issue of Islamic dress, as such, is linked with issues of immigration and the position of Islam in Western Europe.

Contrary to its modern usage, however, the term hijab as used in the Quran can also be interpreted as denoting a partition or a curtain rather than the Islamic rules of modesty. This is the usage in the verses of the Qur'an, in which the term hijab sometimes refers to a curtain separating visitors to Muhammad's main house from his wives' residential lodgings.  
Thus not all Muslims believe the hijab is mandated in Islam.

Legal restrictions on the burqa and niqab, variations of Islamic female clothing which cover the face, are more widespread than restrictions on hijab. There are currently 16 states that have banned the burqa (not to be confused with the hijab), including Tunisia, Austria, Denmark, France, Belgium, Tajikistan, Bulgaria, Cameroon, Chad, Republic of the Congo, Gabon, Netherlands, China (in Xinjiang Region), Morocco, Sri Lanka and Switzerland.

Europe

European Commissioner Franco Frattini said in November 2006, that he did not favor a ban on the burqa. This is apparently the first official statement on the issue of prohibition of Islamic dress from the European Commission, the executive of the European Union.

Islamic dress is also seen as a symbol of the existence of parallel societies, and the failure of integration: in 2006, British Prime Minister Tony Blair described the face veil as a "mark of separation". Proposals to ban hijab may be linked to other related cultural prohibitions, with Dutch politician Geert Wilders proposing a ban on hijab, on Islamic schools, the Quran, on new mosques, and on non-western immigration.

In France and Turkey, the emphasis is on the secular nature of the state, and the symbolic nature of the Islamic dress. In Turkey, bans previously applied at state institutions (courts, civil service) and in state-funded education, but were progressively lifted during the tenure of Recep Tayyip Erdoğan. In 2004, France passed a law banning "symbols or clothes through which students conspicuously display their religious affiliation" (including hijab) in public primary schools, middle schools, and secondary schools, but this law does not concern universities (in French universities, applicable legislation grants students freedom of expression as long as public order is preserved). These bans also cover Islamic headscarves, which in some other countries are seen as less controversial, although law court staff in the Netherlands are also forbidden to wear Islamic headscarves on grounds of 'state neutrality'.

An apparently less politicized argument is that in specific professions (teaching), a ban on "veils" (niqab) may be justified on the grounds that being able to see facial expressions and making eye contact can be helpful in communicating.  This argument has featured prominently in judgments in Britain and the Netherlands, after students or teachers were banned from wearing face-covering clothing.

Public and political response to such prohibition proposals is complex, since by definition they mean that the government decides on individual clothing. Some non-Muslims, who would not be affected by a ban, see it as an issue of civil liberties, as a slippery slope leading to further restrictions on private life. A public opinion poll in London showed that 75 percent of Londoners support "the right of all persons to dress in accordance with their religious beliefs". In another poll in the UK by Ipsos MORI, 61 percent agreed that "Muslim women are segregating themselves" by wearing a veil, yet 77 percent thought they should have the right to wear it. In a later FT-Harris poll conducted in 2010 after the French ban on face covering went into effect, an overwhelming majority in Italy, Spain, Germany, and the UK supported passing such bans in their own countries. The headscarf is perceived to be a symbol of the clash of civilizations by many. Others would also argue that the increase of laws surrounding the banning of headscarves and other religious paraphernalia has led to an increase in not just the sales of headscarves and niqabs, but an increase in the current religiosity of the Muslim population in Europe: as both a product of and a reaction to westernization.

According to a 2017 ruling by the European Court of Justice on a case involving two Belgian women, employers in the EU may restrict the wearing of religious symbols if such regulations on appearance are applied consistently. The court ruled again on a 2021 case from Germany that EU companies could ban employees from wearing religious symbols, including headscarves, to present a "neutral image".

Austria 

In 2017, a legal ban on face-covering clothing was adopted by the Austrian parliament. Headscarves were also banned in 2019 from primary schools, but Kippas worn by Jewish boys and the turban worn by Sikh boys were exempted in the legislature. In 2019, Austria banned the hijab in schools for children up to ten years of age. The Austrian legislators said their motivation was promoting equality between men and women and improving social integration with respect to local customs, and parents who send their child to school with a headscarf would be fined €440 ($427 or £386 ). In 2020 however, the law was overturned by the constitutional court after it was found to be unconstitutional. The court said the legislature was required to treat various religious convictions equally, because the ban did not apply to the Jewish Kippa or to the turban worn by Sikh males. Arab visitors to Zell am See in 2014 were issued brochures by local authorities urging them to take off any burqas.

Belgium 

, Belgium has specific bans on face-covering dress, such as the niqab or burqa. On 11 July 2017, the European Court of Human Rights upheld Belgium's ban on burqas and full-face veils.

Bosnia and Herzegovina 

Bosnia and Herzegovina is officially a secular country.

During the regime of the SFR Yugoslavia the traditional face veil (Bosnian: Zar) was officially banned in 1950.

Communist SFR Yugoslavia assigned the Women's Antifascist Front of Yugoslavia (AFZ) to campaign in favor of the abolition of the veil in Bosnia and Herzegovina, Macedonia and Kosova in 1947 because of the Socialist ideal of gender equality. The campaign was met with opposition from the rural imams, but were supported by the General Assembly of the Islamic Community, who stated that hijab and veiling were not necessary within Islam  and that Islam did not ban women from appearing unveiled in public, and during the campaign in 1947-50 most women in Sarajevo stopped wearing the veil.  However the campaign had little success outside of Sarajevo, and therefore a ban was introduced against the veil on 28 September 1950, a ban which was followed by Montenegro, Serbia and Macedonia as well.

During the 1960s the hijab and other forms of religious clothing were banned for both men (fez and turbans) and women. Since Bosnia's independence in 1992 the ban was lifted. Today, the number of Muslim women wearing the hijab has grown after the end of the SFR Yugoslavia, but they still do face discrimination. In 2016, the hijab and other religious symbols were banned from courts and other institutions but were faced with protests from Muslim women on 7 February 2016. The law still exists in a minority of cantons and has been criticized by the Muslim population. Today, in these cantons, female Muslim lawyers, prosecutors, and others employed in judicial institutions cannot wear the hijab to work.

Bulgaria 

In 2016, a ban on the wearing of face-covering clothing in public was adopted by the Bulgarian parliament. The Bulgarian parliament enacted the ban on the basis of security concerns; however, the ban stimulated conflict as 10 percent of the country's population identifies as Muslim. Women who violate the burqa ban face fines up to €770 ($747 or £676 ) and have their social security benefits suspended.

Denmark 

In late 2017, the Danish government considered adopting a law prohibiting people to wear "attire and clothing masking the face in such a way that it impairs recognizability". The proposal was met with support from the three largest political parties  and was passed into law on 31 May 2018, becoming § 134 c of the Danish Penal Code, stating that "[a]ny person who in a public place wears a item of clothing that covers said person's face shall be liable to a fine" with an exception for coverings that serve "a creditable purpose" (e.g., sports equipment, protection against the cold, masks for carnivals, masquerades etc.). The law came into force on 1 August 2018. On the first day of the implementation of the burqa ban, hundreds of protesters rallied wearing face veils in public. According to the ban, wearing a burqa or a niqab in public can lead to a fine of 1,000 kroner ($130, €134, or £118 ) in case of first time offences, rising to 10,000 kr. ($1,300, €1,340, or £1,180 ) in case of the fourth offence. Under the ban, police are instructed to order women to remove their veils or to leave the public space. Police officers that fail to obey the orders of the ban are subject to be fined.

France 

France is a secular country. One of the key principles of the 1905 French law on the Separation of the Churches and the State is the freedom of religious exercise. Therefore, this law prohibited public servants from wearing any religious signs during work.

In 1994, the French Ministry for Education sent out recommendations to teachers and headmasters to ban the Islamic veil (specified as hijab, niqab, and burka) in educational institutions. According to a 2019 study by the IZA Institute of Labor Economics, a higher proportion of girls of Muslim background born after 1980 graduated from high school, bringing their graduation rates closer to the non-Muslim female cohort. Having a "Muslim background" was defined as having an immigrant father from a predominantly Muslim country (hence, indigenized Muslims with a longer history in France were not considered), as the study was highlighting the "difficulties faced by adolescents with a foreign cultural background in forming their own identity". Males in the Muslim group also had a lower graduation rate than males in the non-Muslim group. While secularism is often criticized for restricting freedom of religion, the study concluded that for the French context, the "implementation of more restrictive policies in French public schools ended up promoting the educational empowerment of some of the most disadvantaged groups of female students".

In 2004, the French law on secularity and conspicuous religious symbols in schools banned most religious signs, including the hijab, from public primary and secondary schools in France. The proposed ban was extremely controversial, with both sides of the political spectrum being split on the issue, some people arguing that the law goes against religious freedom and is racist because it affects mostly Muslim women and Jewish men.

In 2010, a ban on face covering, targeting especially women wearing chador and burqa, was adopted by the French Parliament. According to the Guardian, the "Burqa ban", was challenged and taken to the European Court of Human Rights which upheld the law on 1 July 2014, accepting the argument of the French government that the law was based on "a certain idea of living together". In 2013 "the applicant" stood outside Elysée Palace in niqab and subsequently received a criminal conviction. The French criminal courts noted in 2014 that the lower court was wrong to dismiss her rights covered under article 18 but dismissed her appeal. The French delegation argued that wearing face coverings violated the principle of "living together". Judges Angelika Nussberger and Helena Jäderblom dissented, calling the concept, "far-fetched and vague". Going on to note that the very decision of declaring what a woman is allowed to wear was hypocritical and antithetical to the aim of protecting human rights. The committee came to the determination in 2018 that the case had been incorrectly dismissed after review by a single judge on the grounds that, "the conditions of admissibility laid down in articles 34 and 35 of the Convention [had] not been met." Upon review the committee concluded that the applicants' human rights had been violated under article 18 and 26 of the International Covenant on Civil and Political Rights. The committee dismissed the notion of "living together" as a vague notion not protected under international law.

A broader ban on hijab is regularly proposed by conservative and right-wing politicians. Such a broader ban would include a ban in public universities. However, presidents of universities and most student unions oppose such a ban.

In May 2021, Emmanuel Macron's party La République En Marche barred a Muslim woman from running as one of its local election candidates because she wore a hijab for a photograph on a campaign flier.

Germany 

In 2017, a ban on face-covering clothing for soldiers and state workers during work was approved by German parliament.

Due to rapid demographic changes in Germany following immigration from Muslim countries, public debates ensued which among other topics concerned Islamic veils from the turn of the century onward.

In 2019, Susanne Schröter, an academic at Goethe University Frankfurt planned a conference titled "The Islamic veil – Symbol of dignity or oppression?" which led to a group of students protesting that value judgments on the veil should not be made. The protestors criticized the invitation of journalist Alice Schwarzer and publisher of feminist magazine EMMA. Schröter is a noted critic of Islamic veils and argues that the veil restricts a woman's freedom and usually comes with a bundle of restrictions. Schröter was backed by the president of Frankfurt University who stressed that it is her job to organize academic conferences where diverse opinions can be voiced. The president of the  argued that freedom of speech meant that controversial topics should be resolved by debate, not "boycotts, mobbing or violence". Members of the Uni gegen antimuslimischen Rassismus (English: "University against anti-Muslim racism") boycotted the conference due to their objections regarding the invited participants.

The Alternative for Germany are the largest party in Germany that advocates a ban on the burqa and niqab in public places.

Ireland

In 2018, Taoiseach (Prime Minister) Leo Varadkar ruled out a burka ban in Ireland, saying "I don't like it but I think people are entitled to wear what they want to wear. […] I believe in the freedom of religion. I don't agree with the doctrine of every religion or necessarily any religion, but I do believe in the freedom of religion."

Kosovo

Since 2009, the hijab has been banned in public schools and universities or government buildings. In 2014, the first female parliamentarian with hijab was elected to the Kosovo parliament.

Latvia 
In 2016, The Independent reported that a legal ban of face-covering Islamic clothing was adopted by the Latvian parliament. After long public discussions, draft legislation was approved by Latvian government on 22 August 2017; however, it was never adopted by the parliament as a law.

Malta 
Malta has no restrictions on Islamic dressing such as the veil (hijab) nor the full face veil (burqa or niqab), however an official ban on face covering for religious reasons is ambiguous. However it is guaranteed that individuals are allowed to wear as they wish at their private homes and at the Mosque. Imam El Sadi, from Mariam Al-Batool Mosque, has said that the banning of the niqab and the burka "offends Muslim women". El Sadi said that the Maltese's "attitude towards Muslim women" is positive and despite cultural clashes their dressing is tolerated. Some Muslim women share the belief that it is sinful to be seen in public without veiling themselves, however they are lawfully required to remove it when needed—such as for photos on identifications.

Netherlands 

The States General of the Netherlands enacted a ban on face-covering clothing, popularly described as the "burqa ban", in January 2012. The burqa ban came into force on 1 August 2019 in schools, public transport, healthcare, and government buildings, but there are doubts over whether it will be applied in practice. Amsterdam Mayor Femke Halsema spoke out in her opposition of the law. She stated that removing someone wearing a burqa from public transport in the capital would not be fitting with current Dutch society. Chairman of the Dutch Public Transport Association Pedro Peters also voiced his opinion on the ban. Peters said: "You are not going to stop the bus for half an hour for someone wearing a burqa", waiting for the police to arrive; "we are also not allowed to refuse anyone because we have a transport obligation". Known officially as the Partial Ban on Face-Covering Clothing Act, the act also details that those who refuse to uncover their faces may pay a fine of at least €150 ($146 or £132 ) and can be arrested. Dutch police have also stated that enforcing the ban is not a priority, and that they likely would not respond to a complaint within a thirty-minute timeframe.

The Dutch government has also come under fire for the "burqa ban" from certain members of the UN claiming it is discriminatory toward Muslim women. On 7 October 2019, Tendayi Achiume, the UN Special Rapporteur on racism, wrote a report questioning the perceived inclusivity of Dutch society and how that perception masks a reality of treating racial and ethnic minorities as foreign. Speaking about the "burqa ban" Achiume said "The political debate surrounding the adoption of this law makes plain its intended targeting of Muslim women, and even if this targeting was not the intent, it has certainly been the effect". In her report, Achiume also references a whistleblower in the Hague police department. She said that this whistleblower raised concerns about a culture of racism and targeted discrimination within the police department, and the government must act quickly to combat it.

Norway 

In 2018 the Norwegian parliament voted to ban the burqa in schools and universities.

In April 2019, the Telia telecom company received bomb threats after featuring a Muslim woman taking off her hijab in a commercial. Although the police did not evaluate the threat as likely to be carried out, delivering threats is still a crime in Norway.

Russia
Russia's Stavropol region has a ban on hijabs in schools since 2012. the first of its kind imposed by a region in the Russian Federation. The ruling was upheld by Russia's Supreme Court in July 2013. Hijab is prevalent in North Caucasus republics such as Chechnya and Dagestan and less prevalent in Tatarstan.

Sweden 
In December 2019, the municipality of Skurup banned Islamic veils in educational institutions. Earlier, the municipality of Staffanstorp approved a similar ban.

Switzerland 
In a referendum on 7 March 2021, Swiss voters approved a nationwide ban on the burqa, with over 51 percent of the electorate supporting it.

Earlier, in September 2013, a constitutional referendum in the Canton of Ticino on a popular initiative banning full-face veils was approved with 66.2 percent of the vote. In May 2017, the Landsgemeinde in the Canton of Glarus rejected adopting a similar measure with about two-thirds of the vote.

In September 2018, the Canton of St Gallen become the second canton in Switzerland to vote in favor of a ban on facial coverings in public with two-thirds casting a ballot in favor.

United Kingdom 

The UK has no specific legislation prohibiting any form of traditional Islamic dress. In some cases, hijabs are worn by young girls from age 6–8. According to retail chain Marks & Spencer, the hijabs they sell as part of the school uniform will fit a child aged 3.

Muslim world

Albania

When Albania became independent in 1920, it was declared to be secular country, and veiling were regarded as not only a symbol of religious power but also as a symbol of the gender segregation and isolation of women from society which constituted a wasted societal resource. A ban was introduced in 1929, but not enshrined in law until 1937.

King Zogu I initiated a number of reforms in women's rights as a part of his modernization policy, which were enforced via the local branches of a national women's organization, and one of these reforms were a ban on veiling which was introduced in 1937.  The veil ban in Albanian was not aggressively enforced, since this was not seen as effective, but through persuasion, campaigns by the women's organization, and by the king's sisters, who acted as role models by appearing unveiled.  Unveiling was finnally fully accomplished during the Communist era.

Algeria

During the Algerian War of 1954-1962, it came to be seen as legitimate for Algerian women to break seclusion and participate unveiled in society, when women participated actively in the struggle for national independence. 

In 2018, the government passed a law banning the wearing of full face-veils, called burqas or niqabs, for female public servants while at work. The prime minister at the time, Ahmed Ouyahia, pushed the ban because of his belief that women should be identifiable in the workspace.

Afghanistan

In Afghanistan, the hijab is compulsory for all women and everywhere, including in schools.

In the 1920s, Queen Soraya Tarzi famously removed her veil in public as a part of her support for women's liberation, followed by other elite women, but the radical reform program was met with the deposition of king Amanullah Khan in 1929, and his successor reinstated the veil and gender seclusion and caused a backlash in women's rights.

Following the election of Mohammed Daoud Khan as Prime Minister in 1953, social reforms giving women a more public presence were encouraged. One of his aims was to break free from the ultra-conservative, Islamist tradition of treating women as second-class citizens.  During his time, he made significant advances towards modernization. In 1959, women employed by the state, such as radio announcers, were asked to come to their work places without the veil, instead wearing a loose coat, scarf and cloves; after that, the foreign wives, and daughters of foreign born wives, were asked to venture out on the streets in the same way, and in this way, women without the veil were started to be seen in the streets of Kabul. In August 1959, on the second day of the festival of Jeshyn, Queen Humaira Begum and Princess Bilqis appeared in the royal box at the military parade unveiled, alongside the Prime Minister's wife, Zamina Begum. A group of Islamic clerics sent a letter of protest to the Prime minister to protest and demand that the words of sharia be respected. The Prime minister answered by inviting them to the capital and present proof to him that the holy scripture indeed demanded the chadri. When the clerics could not find such a passage, the Prime Minister declared that the female members of the Royal Family would no longer wear veils because the Islamic law did not demand it.  While the chadri was never banned, the example of the Queen and the Prime Minister's wife was followed by the wives and daughters of government officials as well as by other urban women of the upper class and middle class, with Kubra Noorzai and Masuma Esmati-Wardak known as the first commoner pioneers.
 
In the mid-20th century, many women in urban areas did not wear headcoverings, but this ended with the outbreak of civil war in the 1990s. The Afghan chadri is a regional style of burqa with a mesh covering the eyes. The burqa became a symbol of the conservative and totalitarian Taliban rule, who strictly enforced female adults to wear the dress. Even after the 2001 defeat of the Taliban and the following Islamic Republic of Afghanistan, some women continued to wear it out of security concerns. People opposed to the burqa claim it is not Islamic, nor part of Afghan culture.

After the Fall of Kabul, an interviewed Taliban spokesperson rejected the idea that "women should not wear headscarves for education", saying it was not part of their culture. In September 2021, the Taliban mandated that women attending private Afghan universities must wear a niqab. On 7 May 2022, the Taliban made a law requiring all women to wear a burqa or niqab, despite that the law never really enforced and most Afghan women choose to ignore it.

Azerbaijan 

Veil as a part of woman's wardrobe was the trait of all cities where trade was developing. The anti-veil movement was initially started in 1908 in Baku by liberal bourgeoisie well before the Soviet Hujum in 1927. However, the anti-veil protests were suppressed by Islamic clergy, causing a major setback. While some women stopped wearing the veil then, many still wore the veil out of social pressure.  A prominent Azeri women's organization based in Baku, the Ali Bayramov Club, successfully participated in the campaign to encourage women to take off the veil. The Statue of a Liberated Woman was erected in memory over the abolition of mandatory hijab.

With Azerbaijan's secular tradition, there has reportedly been a general perception in the country linking the hijab with extremism. Many covered women have reported experiencing job discrimination.

Bahrain 

The traditional garments of women in Bahrain include the jellabiya, a long, loose dress, which is one of the preferred clothing styles for the home. Bahraini women may practice the muhtashima, partially covering the hair, or the muhajiba, fully covering the hair.

Bangladesh

In Bangladesh, hijab is not mandated by law. 

The purdah for muslim upper- and middle-class women in India and later Pakistan and Bangladesh, both in the form of gender segregation as well as the veil, fell out of fashion due to women's active mobilisation in the anticolonial struggle for independence. 
The anti colonial independence movement in the Muslim world was dominated by secular modernists, who considered women's liberation as a natural part of achieving a modernized and revitalized Muslim world, and by the 1930s muslim upper-class women had started to appear unveiled.

Veiling were historically not common in Bangladesh. Middle- and upper class women dressed in modern clothing and working class women in traditional Indian garb, and veiling were seen by the middle class as a sign of low class and low education. In the 1980s, veils were reportedly a rare sight in the capital of Dhaka. 

From the 1990s onward veiling gradually become more common in Bangladesh along the rise of political Islam and Islamic revivalism in society, and in the early 21st-century veiling started to become common. 

In a 2010 the Bangladesh High Court, in a legal dispute between a local official and the director of a school, ruled that the veil was "a personal choice of women" and that the Ministry of Education should ensure that women employed in public institutions were not forced to wear a veil or hijab against their will. 

By 2022, the attitude around veiling had changed and veiling had become common in Bangladesh, and some women experienced pressure by their families to veil. A study by Manusher Jonno Foundation and DNET found that 44% of people think women who wear veils or hijabs are “good girls,” and 63% think that women who wear “western clothing” are “bad girls” who are shredding the fabric of society.

Egypt

The hijab became more unpopular with educated women, including devout Muslims, in the early 20th century as the British authorities discouraged it and as women sought to gain modern positions of power.  After returning from the International Woman Suffrage Alliance Congress in Rome in 1923, the feminist Huda Sha'arawi she removed her veil and mantle, a signal event in the history of Egyptian feminism. Women who came to greet her were shocked at first then broke into applause and some of them removed their veils and mantles. Within a decade of Huda's act of defiance, all Egyptian women  stopped wearing veils and mantles for many decades until a retrograde movement occurred. Her decision to remove  her veil and  mantle was part of a greater movement of women, and was influenced by French born Egyptian feminist named Eugénie Le Brun, but it contrasted with some feminist thinkers like Malak Hifni Nasif.

In 1953, Egyptian leader President Gamal Abdel Nasser was told by the leader of the Muslim Brotherhood that they wanted to enforce the wearing of the hijab, to which Nasser responded: "Sir, I know you have a daughter in college—and she doesn't wear a headscarf or anything! Why don't you make her wear the headscarf? So you can't make one girl, your own daughter, wear it, and yet you want me to go and make ten million women wear it?".

The veil gradually disappeared in the following decades, so much so that by 1958 an article by the United Press (UP) stated that "the veil is unknown here." However, the veil has been having a resurgence since the Iranian Revolution, concomitant with the global revival of Muslim piety. According to The New York Times, about 90 percent of Egyptian women currently wear a headscarf. Women chose to adopt the veil in the post-1970s period, with some contradicting relatives who were against the hijab.

Small numbers of women wear the niqab. The secular government does not encourage women to wear it, fearing it will present an Islamic extremist political opposition. In the country, it is negatively associated with Salafist political activism. There has been some restrictions on wearing the hijab by the government, which views hijab as a political symbol. In 2002, two presenters were excluded from a state run TV station for deciding to wear hijab on national television. The American University in Cairo, Cairo University and Helwan University attempted to forbid entry to niqab wearers in 2004 and 2007.

Muhammad Sayyid Tantawy, Grand Imam of al-Azhar, issued a fatwa in October 2009 arguing that veiling of the face is not required under Islam. He had reportedly asked a student to take off her niqab when he spotted her in a classroom, and he told her that the niqab is a cultural tradition without Islamic importance. Government bans on wearing the niqab on college campuses at the University of Cairo and during university exams in 2009 were overturned later. Minister Hany Mahfouz Helal met protests by some human rights and Islamist groups.

Many Egyptians in the elite are opposed to hijab, believing it harms secularism. By 2012 some businesses had established bans on veils, and Egyptian elites supported these bans.

Indonesia

While Islam was introduced to Java in the 15th- and 16th-centuries, the veiling and harem seclusion was never common except for the princely courts, and in 1954 veiling was still not a common custom.  The traditional clothing for women were the kebaya and the sarung, which did not cover the shape of the body, and a loose shawl, kerundung, which did not cover the hair, and 20th-century urban women wore Western-style clothing, and looked down upon veiling as "village like".  The practice of veiling became introduced to Indonesia as a part of the Islamic revivalism after the Iranian revolution of 1979, and in 1982 the veil was temporarily banned in schools to prevent its introduction in Indonesia.

Under Indonesian national and regional law, outside Aceh, female headcovering is entirely optional and not obligatory.
In Indonesia, the term jilbab is used without exception to refer to the hijab. Many nuns refer to their habit as a jilbab, perhaps out of the colloquial use of the term to refer to any religious headcovering. 

Culturally to the Javanese majority, plain, Saudi-style hijab, the niqab or socially worse yet the indigenous peasant kerudung (known in North Sumatran languages as tudung) is considered vulgar, low-class and a faux pas – the traditional Javanese hijab are transparent, sheer, intricately brocaded or embroidered fine silk or lace tailored to match either their sarung or kebaya blouse.

Some women may choose to wear a headscarf to be more "formal" or "religious", such as the jilbab or kerudung (a native tailored veil with a small, stiff visor). Such formal or cultural Muslim events may include official governmental events, funerals, circumcision (sunatan) ceremonies or weddings. However, wearing Islamic attire to Christian relatives' funerals and weddings and entering the church is quite uncommon.
Young girls may elect to wear the hijab publicly to avoid unwanted low-class male attention and sexual harassment and thus display their respectability as "good Muslim girls": that is, they are not "easy" conquests. 

Islamic private school uniform code dictate that female students must wear the jilbab (commonly white or blue-grey, Indonesia's national secondary school colors), in addition to long-sleeved blouse and ankle-length skirt. Islamic schools must by law provide access to Christians (and vice versa Catholic and Protestant schools allow Muslim students), and so it is mandated to be worn by Christian students who attend Muslim school, while its use by Muslim students is not objected to in Christian schools. In May 2021, a government decree was issued banning schools from enforcing the jilbab as part of their uniform, after reports of discrimination against girls who removed them surfaced. In July 2021, Indonesia's Supreme Court reversed a government regulation issued earlier that had allowed girls under 18 in state schools to not wear a mandatory jilbab.

Since 25 March 2015, female police officers can now wear hijab if they want. Flight attendants are not required to wear hijab except during flights to Aceh province.

Compounding the friction and often anger toward baju Arab (Arab clothes), is the ongoing physical and emotional abuse of Indonesian women in Saudi Arabia, as guest workers, commonly maids or as Hajja pilgrims and Saudi Wahhabi intolerance for non-Saudi dress code has given rise to mass protests and fierce Indonesian debate up to the highest levels of government about boycotting Saudi Arabia—especially the profitable all Hajj pilgrimage—as many high-status women have been physically assaulted by Saudi morality police for nonconforming headwear or even applying lip balm, leading some to comment on the post-pan Arabist repressiveness of certain Arab nations due to excessively rigid, narrow, and erroneous interpretation of Sharia law.

Aceh Province

The sole exception where jilbab is mandatory is in Aceh Province for Muslim women, under Islamic sharia-based Law No. 18/2001, granting Aceh special autonomy, and through its regional regulation Qanun No. 11/2002. Unique among Indonesian regional governments, Aceh was allowed to implement sharia law by the Indonesian national government as part of the peace settlement with the Free Aceh Movement. This Acehnese hukum syariah and the reputedly overbearing "morality police" who enforce its (Aceh-only) mandatory public wearing are the subject of fierce debate, especially with regard to its validity vis-a-vis the Constitution among Acehnese male and female Muslim academics, Acehnese male and female Muslim politicians and female rights advocates.

Iran

 
In Iran, since 1981, after the 1979 Islamic Revolution, the hijab has become compulsory. All women are required to wear loose-fitting clothing and a headscarf in public.
 
During the Middle Ages, Turkic nomadic tribes from Central Asia arrived, whose women did not wear headscarves. However, after the Safavid centralization in the 16th century, the headscarf became defined as the standard head dress for many religious women in urban areas all around the Iranian Empire. Exceptions to this were seen only in the villages and among nomadic tribes, such as Qashqai. Covering the whole face was rare among the Iranians and was mostly restricted to local Arabs and local Afghans. Later, during the economic crisis in the late 19th century under the Qajar dynasty, the poorest religious urban women could not afford headscarves.

On 8 January 1936, Reza Shah issued a decree, Kashf-e hijab, banning all veils. The ban was left in place for a period of five years, from 1936 to 1941. 

Official measures were relaxed in 1941 under Reza Shah's successor, Mohammad Reza Pahlavi, and the wearing of a headscarf or chador was no longer an offence, but was still considered an indicator of backwardness or of membership of the lower class. In the 1970s, the chador was usually a patterned or of a lighter color such as white or beige; black chadors were typically reserved for mourning and only became more acceptable everyday wear starting in the mid-1970s—however in the period before the Iranian Revolution the black chador's usage outside of the city of Qom was associated with allegiance with political Islam and was stigmatized by areas of Iranian society. Discrimination against women wearing the headscarf or chador occurred, with public institutions discouraging their use, and some eating establishments refusing to admit women who wore them.

In the aftermath of the revolution, hijab was made compulsory in stages. In 1979, Ayatollah Khomeini announced that women should observe Islamic dress code. Almost immediately after, starting from 8 March 1979 (International Women's Day), thousands of women began protesting against mandatory Hijab. The protests lasted six days, until 14 March. The demonstrations were met by government assurances that the statement was only a recommendation. Hijab was subsequently made mandatory in government and public offices in 1980, and in 1983 it became mandatory for all women (including non-Muslims and non-citizens).  According to one source, rules on wearing hijab are "tantamount" to the Islamic Republic's "raison d'etat". Two slogans of the 1979 revolution were: "Wear a veil, or we will punch your head" and "Death to the unveiled". Under Book 5, article 638, women in Iran who do not wear a hijab may be imprisoned from 10 days to two months, and/or required to pay fines from 50,000 up to 500,000 rials adjusted for inflation.

In 1983, the Islamic Consultative Assembly decided that women who do not cover their hair in public will be punished with 74 lashes. Since 1995, unveiled women can also be imprisoned for up to 60 days.

White Wednesday 
In May 2017, My Stealthy Freedom, an Iranian online movement advocating for women's freedom of choice, created the White Wednesday movement: a campaign that invites men and women to wear white veils, scarves, or bracelets to show their opposition to the mandatory forced veiling code. The movement was geared toward women who proudly wear their veils, but reject the idea that all women in Iran should be subject to forced veiling. Masih Alinejad, an Iranian-born journalist and activist based in the UK and the US, created the movement to protest Iran's mandatory hijab rule. She described her 2017 movement via Facebook, saying, "This campaign is addressed to women who willingly wear the veil, but who remain opposed to the idea of imposing it on others. Many veiled women in Iran also find the compulsory imposition of the veil to be an insult. By taking videos of themselves wearing white, these women can also show their disagreement with compulsion." The campaign resulted in Iranian women posting pictures and videos of themselves wearing pieces of white clothing to social media.

Compulsory female veiling 

On 27 December 2017, 31-year-old Vida Movahed, also known as "The Girl of Enghelab Street" was arrested for being unveiled in public after a video of the woman went viral on social media. The video showed Movahed silently waving her hijab, a white headscarf that she had removed from her head and placed on a stick for one hour on Enqelab Street, Tehran. At first it was assumed that her act was connected to the widespread protests taking place in Iran, but Movahed confirmed that she performed the act in support of the 2017 White Wednesday campaign. Vida's arrest sparked outrage from social media, where many Iranians shared footage of her protest along with the hashtag "#Where_Is_She?". On 28 January 2018, Nasrin Sotoudeh, a renowned human rights lawyer, posted on Facebook that Vida had been released. It was not until a few weeks later that Sotoudeh revealed the girl's identity. In the following weeks, multiple people re-enacted Vida's public display of removing their hijabs and waving them in the air. On 1 February 2018, the Iranian police released a statement saying that they had arrested 29 people, mostly women, for removing their headscarves, contrary to Iranian law. One woman, Shima Babaei, was arrested after removing her headdress in front of a court as a symbol of her continued dedication to the cause.

On 23 February 2018, Iranian Police released an official statement saying that any women found protesting Iran's compulsory veiling code would be charged with "inciting corruption and prostitution," which carries a maximum sentence of 10 years in prison. Before this change, according to article 638 of the Islamic Penal Code of the Islamic Republic of Iran, "Anyone in public places and roads who openly commits a harām (sinful) act, in addition to the punishment provided for the act, shall be sentenced to two months imprisonment or up to 74 lashes; and if they commit an act that is not punishable but violates public prudency, they shall only be sentenced ten days to two months' imprisonment or up to 74 lashes. Note- Women who appear in public places and roads without wearing an Islamic hijab, shall be sentenced ten days to two months' imprisonment or a fine of five hundred to fifty thousand rials."

Following the announcement, multiple women reported being subjected to physical abuse by police following their arrests. Some have since been sentenced to multiple years in prison for their acts of defiance. In one video, a woman stands on top of a tall box, unveiled, waving her white scarf at passers by. The video then shows a man in a police uniform tackling the woman to the ground. Shortly after the video went viral, the Ministry of Interior (Iran) scolded police for using physical force against the woman. Salman Samani, a spokesman for Ministry released a statement on 25 February 2018 saying "No one has a license to act against the law even in the role of an officer dealing with crimes."

On 8 March 2018, a video of three Iranian women singing a feminist fight song in Tehran's subway went viral on. The women were singing in honor of International Women's Day and to highlight women's continued challenges caused by forced veiling and other discriminatory laws against women. In the video, in which three bare-headed Iranian women sing I am a Woman, calls upon women to join efforts to fight injustice and create "another world" of "equality". The women hold hands, display pictures of a previous women's rights protest, and ask the other women on the subway train to clap in honor of "having lived and fought all their lives against all kinds of discrimination, violence, humiliation, and insults." At the end of the video, one of the protestors is heard saying "Happy Women's Day to all of you."

That same day, the Supreme Leader of Iran, Ali Khamenei, made a speech during a gathering of religious poets in Tehran, posting a series of tweets in response to the series of peaceful hijab protests. Khamenei defended the dress code, praising Islam for keeping women "modest" and in their "defined roles" such as educators and mothers. He also lashed out at the Western world for, in his view, leading its own women astray. "The features of today's Iranian woman include modesty, chastity, eminence, protecting herself from abuse by men," Khamenei tweeted. He claimed that the most sought after characteristic of a Western woman involve is her ability to physically attract men.

Also outside of Iran, Melika Balali, an Iranian-Scottish wrestler, became the British champion in June 2022, she protested in the match against compulsory hijab by rising a sign which wrote on it "Stop forcing hijab, I have the right to be a wrestler".

The Iranian protests against compulsory hijab continued into the September 2022 Iranian protests which was triggered in response to the killing of Mahsa Amini, who was allegedly beaten to death by police due to wearing an "improper hijab".

Iraq

The Iraqi sociologist Ali Al-Wardi mentioned that women in Iraq were not used to wearing the hijab, as the Hijab wasn't common before the 1930s, and the hijab was only widespread among the wives of Ottoman employees and clerics during the Ottoman period.

In the 1920s, when the Iraqi women's movement begun under the Women's Awakening Club, the opposing conservatives accused it of wanting to unveil women.

Majda al-Haidari, wife of Raouf al-Chadirchi, has sometimes been said to be the first woman in Baghdad to have appeared unveiled in the 1930s, but the Communist Amina al-Rahal, sister of Husain al-Rahal, have also been named as the first unveiled role model in Baghdad. In the 1930s and 1940s, female College students gradually started to appear unveiled, and most upper- and middle class urban women in Iraq were said to be unveiled by 1963. 
In Ba'athist Iraq (1968-2003), the Secular Socialist Baath Party women were officially stated to be equal to men, and urban women were normally unveiled.

After the fall of Saddam Hussein in 2003, there was a surge in threats and harassment of unveiled women, and the use of hijab became common in Iraq. In 2017, the Iraqi army imposed a burqa ban in the liberated areas of Mosul for the month of Ramadan. Police stated that the temporary ban was for security measures, so that ISIS bombers could not disguise themselves as women.

Iraq in general does not have laws pertaining to headscarves however it is advised to wear hijab in the holy cities of Najaf and Karbala.

Israel and Palestine 

In Gaza, school officials have rejected a hijab policy for women. They have also targeted those who seek to impose the hijab.

Israel proper
In July 2010, some Israeli lawmakers and women's rights activists proposed a bill to the Knesset banning face-covering veils. According to the Jerusalem Post, the measure is generally "regarded as highly unlikely to become law." Chana Kehat, founder of the Jewish women's rights group Kolech, criticized a ban and also commented "Fashion also often oppresses women with norms which lead to anorexia." Eilat Maoz, general coordinator for the Coalition of Women for Peace, referred to a ban as "a joke" that would constitute "racism". In Israel, orthodox Jews dress modestly by keeping most of their skin covered. Married women cover their hair, most commonly in the form of a scarf, also in the form of hats, snoods, berets, or, sometimes, wigs.

Gaza Strip (Palestine)

Successful informal coercion of women by sectors of society to wear Islamic dress or hijab has been reported in the Gaza Strip where Mujama' al-Islami, the predecessor of Hamas, reportedly used a mixture of consent and coercion to "'restore' hijab" on urban-educated women in Gaza in the late 1970s and 1980s. Similar behavior was displayed by Hamas during the First Intifada. Hamas campaigned for the wearing of the hijab alongside other measures, including insisting that women stay at home, they should be segregated from men, and for the promotion of polygamy. During the course of this campaign women who chose not to wear the hijab were verbally and physically harassed, with the result that the hijab was being worn "just to avoid problems on the streets".

Following the takeover of the Gaza Strip in June 2007, Hamas has attempted to implement Islamic law in the Gaza Strip, mainly at schools, institutions and courts by imposing the Islamic dress or hijab on women.

Some of the Islamization efforts met resistance. When Palestinian Supreme Court Justice Abdel Raouf Al-Halabi ordered women lawyers to wear headscarves and caftans in court, attorneys contacted satellite television stations including Al-Arabiya to protest, causing Hamas's Justice Ministry to cancel the directive.

In 2007, the Islamic group Swords of Truth threatened to behead female TV broadcasters if they did not wear the hijab. "We will cut throats, and from vein to vein, if needed to protect the spirit and moral of this nation," their statement said. The group also accused the women broadcasters of being "without any [...] shame or morals". Personal threats against female broadcasters were also sent to the women's mobile phones, though it was not clear if these threats were from the same group. Gazan anchorwomen interviewed by Associated Press said that they were frightened by the Swords of Truth statement.

In February 2011, Hamas banned the styling of women's hair, continuing its policy of enforcing Sharia upon women's clothing.

Hamas has imposed analogous restrictions on men as well as women. For example, men are no longer allowed to be shirtless in public.

Unlike Hamas, Palestinian jihadists belonging to the Unified Leadership (UNLU) have rejected a hijab policy for women. They have also targeted those who seek to impose the hijab.

Jordan
There are no laws requiring the wearing of headscarves nor any banning such from any public institution.

In the 1950s, the Queen of Jordan appeared unveiled in public for the first time, and after this, it became acceptable for educated urban women to appear unveiled.

The use of the headscarf increased during the 1980s. However, the use of the headscarf is generally prevalent among the lower and lower-middle class. Veils covering the face as well as the chador are extremely rare. It is widely believed that the Hijab is increasingly becoming a fashion and cultural statement rather than a religious one in Jordan with some Jordanian women wearing stylish headscarves along with modern-style clothing.

Kazakhstan 

The word "hijab" was used only for certain style of hijab, and such style of hijab was not commonly worn by Muslims there until the fall of the Soviet Union. Some Islamic adherents (like Uzbeks) used to wear the paranja, while others (Chechens, Kara-Chai, Tajiks, Kazakhs, Turkmens, etc.) wore traditional scarves the same way as a bandanna and have own traditional styles of headgear which are not called by the word hijab.
In the 1920s during the Soviet era, a series of policies and actions taken by the Communist Party of the Soviet Union, initiated by Joseph Stalin, to remove all manifestations of gender inequality, especially on the systems of female veiling and seclusion practiced in Central Asia.

In September 2017, schools in some regions of Kazakhstan banned girls wearing headscarves from further attendance. Attempts by Muslim parents to challenge the ban had failed . In February 2018, the government proposed a ban on people wearing niqabs and similar forms of female dress in public.

Kuwait

During the liberal Arab nationalist era in the 1950s, women's liberation and unveiling were seen by Kuwaiti liberals as a natural part of the progress of a new independent nation; feminists like Fatima Hussain burned their veils and in the 1960s and 1970s, unveiled women were the norm.  This development turned around due to a growing Islamization in Kuwaiti life, which were to make veiling the norm again in the 1990s.

In 1978, the Government of Kuwait announced official Islamization policies and laws. Islamist women were very influential during this period, especially in public, as burqa adoption was a very visible symbol of the Islamist movement. In 1981, Bayader As-Salam, a religious group focusing on cultural awareness, formed. The same year Sheikha Latifa Al-Sabah, then-wife of Emir Saad Al-Salim Al-Sabah, established the Islamic Care Association, seeking to spread Islam along with the associated lifestyle and conduct of Muslim life.

Along with fellow MP (member of parliament) Rola Dashti, Aseel al-Awadhi chose not to wear a hijab when she took her seat in the National Assembly in 2008. This decision was criticized by Islamist MPs, including prominent Islamic Salafi Alliance member Ali al-Omair. The Constitutional Court rejected a case which claimed that refusal to wear a hijab was a violation of Kuwaiti law.

Kyrgyzstan 
The word "hijab" was used only for certain style of hijab, and such style of hijab was not commonly worn by Muslims there until the fall of the Soviet Union. Some Islamic adherents (like Uzbeks) used to wear the paranja, while others (Chechens, Kara-Chai, Tajiks, Kazakhs, Turkmens, etc.) wore traditional scarves the same way as a bandanna and have own traditional styles of headgear which are not called by the word hijab.
In the 1920s during the Soviet era, a series of policies and actions taken by the Communist Party of the Soviet Union, initiated by Joseph Stalin, to remove all manifestations of gender inequality, especially on the systems of female veiling and seclusion practiced in Central Asia.

Some schools reportedly banned Muslim students from attending classes in 2011 and 2012 over their headscarf. A school in Kara-Suu officially banned wearing the hijab for classes in 2015.

Lebanon
There is no law requiring the veiling of women in Lebanon, and women are free to dress as they wish. Many women choose not to veil. It must be noted, however, that 32.4% of Lebanon's population is in fact Christian.

An important event in the growing trend of unveiling among upper-class women in Lebanon and Syria in the 1920s was the publication of al-Sufur wa-l-hijab by Nazira Zeineddine in 1928, which did not consider veiling necessary.

Libya

In Libya, there are no law requiring veiling, but it has nonetheless become the common custom.

Central to the revolution of 1969 was the empowerment of women and removal of inferior status. In the 1970s, female emancipation was in large measure a matter of age. One observer generalized that city women under the age of thirty-five had discarded the traditional veil and were quite likely to wear Western-style clothing. Those between the ages of thirty-five and forty-five were increasingly ready to consider such a change, but women over the age of forty-five appeared reluctant to give up the protection which they perceived their veils and customary dress to afford. A decade later, veiling was uncommon among urban women of the 1980s.  This changed in the 2000s, when the veiling of women gradually started become the norm again.

Malaysia

(The word is used with that meaning in other contexts, e.g. , a dish cover for food.) Muslim women may freely choose whether or not to wear the headscarf. The exception is when visiting a mosque, where the  must be worn; this requirement also includes non-Muslims.

Although headscarves are permitted in government institutions, public servants are prohibited from wearing the full-facial veil or niqab. A judgment from the then-Supreme Court of Malaysia in 1994 cites that the niqab, or purdah, "has nothing to do with (a woman's) constitutional right to profess and practise her Muslim religion", because Islam does not make it obligatory to cover the face.

Although wearing the hijab, or tudung, is not mandatory for women in Malaysia, some government buildings enforce within their premises a dress code which bans women, Muslim and non-Muslim, from entering while wearing "revealing clothes".

, the vast majority of Muslim Malaysian (mostly ethnic Malay) women wear the tudung, a type of hijab. This use of the tudung was uncommon prior to the 1979 Iranian Revolution, and the places that had women in tudung tended to be rural areas. The usage of the tudung sharply increased after the 1970s, as religious conservatism among Malay people in both Malaysia and Singapore increased.

Several members of the Kelantan ulama in the 1960s believed the hijab was not mandatory. By 2015, the Malaysian ulama believed this previous 'fatwa' was un-Islamic.

By 2015, Malaysia had a fashion industry related to the tudung.

Malaysian activist Maryam Lee reportedly received vitriolic backlash and death threats in 2020 for criticizing what she saw as institutional patriarchy in Islam and speaking out about her decision to not wear the hijab. Malaysian authorities questioned her for possibly breaching a law against insulting the religion.

Maldives

There are no official laws in the Constitution of the Maldives that require women to cover their heads, but since the early 21st-century Maldivian women has commonly wore a hijab and niqab in public. Although the majority of Maldivian women wear the veil (2017), this is a phenomenon experienced in the past two decades or so, as a response to increased religious conservatism. 

The Maldives became Muslim in the 12th-century but women did not veil: in 1337, the Muslim traveller Ibn Battuta expressed his dislike of the fact that the Muslim women of the Maldives did not veil  and only wore a skirt (called feyli) over the lower half of their bodies, and that he had no success in ordering them to cover up.  
With the exception of a failed attempt to force women to veil in the 17th-century, veiling continued to be uncommon in the Maldives until the 20th-century. 

From the 1980s onward the veiling started to become more common in the Maldives due to growing Islamic conservatism, and in the early 21st-century women and girls was put under a growing social pressure to veil, resulting in hijab and black robes becoming common public wear by 2006.
 
In 2007, the US Department of State's annual International Religious Freedom Report referenced one instance in which a female student was restricted from attending school for wearing a headscarf, despite civil servants wearing them at work without issue;  conversely, there are reports of women being pressured into covering themselves by close relatives; of unveiled women being harassed, and of school girls being pressured to veil by their teachers. 
Women who refuse to wear a veil or decide to remove it face social stigma from both their families and members of the public.

Morocco

In 1947, Princess Lalla Aicha of Morocco started to appear in public unveiled with the support of her father the King, who wished to send a signal that he supported the emancipation of women.

In Morocco, the headscarf is neither enforced by law nor forbidden by law, and women are free to choose if they wish to wear one. The headscarf is more frequent in the northern regions, small to medium cities and rural regions. As it is not totally widespread, wearing a hijab is considered rather a religious decision. In 2005, a schoolbook for basic religious education was heavily criticized for picturing female children with headscarves, and later the picture of the little girl with the Islamic headscarf was removed from the school books. The headscarf is strongly and implicitly forbidden in Morocco's military and the police.

In January 2017, Morocco banned the manufacturing, marketing, and sale of the burqa.

Northern Cyprus
Muslim Turkish-Cypriot women wore traditional Islamic headscarves. When leaving their homes, Muslim Cypriot women would cover their faces by pulling a corner of the headscarf across their nose and mouth, a custom recorded as early as 1769.

In accordance with the islands' strict moral code, Turkish Cypriot women also wore long skirts or pantaloons in order to cover the soles of their feet. Most men covered their heads with either a headscarf (similar to a wrapped keffiyeh, "a form of turban") or a fez. Turbans have been worn by Cypriot men since ancient times and were recorded by Herodotus, during the Persian rule of the island, to demonstrate their "oriental" customs compared to Greeks.

Following the globalization of the island, however, many younger Sunni Muslim Turkish-Cypriots abandoned wearing traditional dress, such as headscarves. Yet they are still worn by older Muslim Cypriot women.

Until the removal of ban on headscarf in universities in Turkey in 2008, women from Turkey moved to study in Northern Cyprus since many universities there did not apply any ban on headscarf. Whilst many Turkish Cypriot women no longer wear headscarves, recent immigrants from Turkey, settled in villages in Northern Cyprus, do.

Oman

The rules of  modesty in Islamic culture require a woman to be modestly covered at all times, especially when traveling farther from the home. At home, the Omani woman wears a long dress to her knees along with ankle-length pants and a leeso, or scarf, covering her hair and neck. Multitudes of lively colored Jalabiyyas are also worn at home. Once outside the home, dress is varied according to regional tastes. For some of a more conservative religious background, the burqa is expected to be worn to cover her face in the presence of other males, along with the wiqaya, or head scarf, and the abaya, an all-enveloping cloak revealing only her hands and feet. Many women from varying regions of the Sultanate wear the scarf to cover only their hair.

The cotton burqa is symbolic of the expectations of the ideal woman and act as a mark of respect to represent her modesty and honor as well as her status. The burqa, first worn by a young girl after her seven-day honeymoon, is on whenever she is in the presence of strangers or outside the home, covering most of her face from view. The highest and lowest classes of Omanis do not wear the burqa—the highest being the children and relatives of the Sultan and the lowest being the poorest women in the town. This makes the burqa a symbol of rank as well. Some burqa differ in regions and designs as well, varying in size, shape and color. The Quran, however, makes no references specific to the modern day burqa.

The abaya is the conservative dress of choice, favored by women of most social classes and regions. The multitudes of designs and decadent embellishments on the modern day abaya has allowed it to become a versatile clothing that can be made either plain or a fashion statement, in Oman and in other neighboring Islamic countries.

Pakistan

In Pakistan, hijab is not mandated by law. Most women wear a dupatta as a headscarf and niqab and burqas are more common in the northwest, especially Khyber Pakhtunkhwa.

The purdah for muslim upper- and middle-class women in India and later Pakistan, both in the form of gender segregation as well as the veil, fell out of fashion due to women's active mobilisation in the anticolonial struggle for independence. The anti colonial independence movement in the Muslim world was dominated by secular modernists, who considered women's liberation as a natural part of achieving a modernized and revitalized Muslim world, and by the 1930s, Muslim upper-class women had started to appear unveiled.

During the Islamization policy of Muhammad Zia-ul-Haq from 1977 to 1988, women were highly encouraged to veil, and although no law of general compulsory veiling was introduced, all women employed by the federal government (including flight attendants and state television anchors), and university students were mandated to veil. In June 1988, General Zia decreed Sharia law as the supreme law of Pakistan.  These regulations were repealed after the death of Zia-ul-Haq.

In 2019, the government of Khyber Pakhtunkhwa mandated a law requiring hijab for female students, however it was reversed after much backlash.

Qatar
Women and men are expected to dress in a manner that is modest, but the dress code is generally driven by social customs and is more relaxed in comparison to other nations in the region. Qatari women generally wear customary dresses that include "long black robes" and black head cover "hijab", locally called bo'shiya. However, the more traditional Sunni Muslim clothing for women are the black colored body covering known as the abayah together with the black scarf used for covering their heads known as the shayla. The Abaya and Shayla is expected to be worn by Qatari women. Women who do not comply may face harsh consequences by their families or spouses.

It is believed that Qatari women began using face masks in the 19th century amid substantial immigration. As they had no practical ways of concealing their faces from foreigners, they began wearing the same type of face mask as their Persian counterparts.

Saudi Arabia
Since 2018, the hijab or any other form of headcovering is not required in Saudi Arabia legally. At one time, Saudi Arabian dress code used to require all women, local and foreign, to wear an abaya, a garment that only covers the body and arms in public. According to some popular Salafi scholars, a woman is to cover her entire body, including her face and hands, in front of unrelated men. Hence, the vast majority of traditional Saudi women are expected on a social standing to cover their body and hair in public historically, while in recent decade covering has become more relaxed.

The Saudi niqāb usually leaves a long open slot for the eyes; the slot is held together by a string or narrow strip of cloth.

In the country, although the hijab is not compulsory, it is expected to be worn in the holy cities of Mecca and Medina.

According to Crown Prince Mohammed bin Salman, women are not required to cover their heads or wear the abaya, provided their clothing is "decent and respectful."

Somalia

Under the Socialist Siad Barre regime (1969-1991), women were free to dress as they wished, and most urban women did not wear hijab; however, after the outbreak of the Somali Civil War in 1991, most women in Mogadishu started to wear hijab for the first time, and those who did not were harassed.

Sudan

In 1983, the sharia law was enacted in Sudan, and from 1989, women were forced to wear a hijab whenever they left their home.

Since 2019 the hijab is no longer mandatory and there no longer is a modesty law as Sudan has become a secular state. Muslims without hijabs are common but Sudan still culturally follows very conservative values. While the hijab was not explicitly mandated by law, Sudanese women were required to dress modestly in public. Due to Sudan's vaguely worded Public Order law, there were no delineated parameters of what constitutes immodest dress. The law stated: "Whoever does in a public place an indecent act or an act contrary to public morals or wears an obscene outfit or contrary to public morals or causing an annoyance to public feelings shall be punished with flogging which may not exceed forty lashes or with fine or with both". In 2013, the case of Amira Osman Hamid came to international attention when she chose to expose her hair in public, in opposition to the nation's public-order laws.

Syria

During a famous demonstration by women against the French Colonial regime in Syria in 1922, the women protesting removed their veils in public. During the 1920s, upper-class women in Syria started to appear unveiled in public, which caused great opposition from religious conservaties, who sometimes attacked unveiled women with acid.  An important event in the growing trend of unveiling among upper-class women in Lebanon and Syria in the 1920s was the publication of al-Sufur wa-l-hijab by Nazira Zeineddine in 1928, which did not consider veiling to be Islamically necessary.

In 2010, Ghiyath Barakat, Syria's minister of higher education, announced a ban on women wearing full-face veils at universities. The official stated that the face veils ran counter to secular and academic principles of Syria. However, the ban strictly addresses veils that cover the head and mouth, and does not include hijabs, or headscarfs, which most Syrian women wear.

Tajikistan 

The word "hijab" was used only for certain style of hijab, and such style of hijab was not commonly worn by Muslims there until the fall of the Soviet Union. Some Islamic adherents (like Uzbeks) used to wear the paranja, while others (Chechens, Kara-Chai, Tajiks, Kazakhs, Turkmens, etc.) wore traditional scarves the same way as a bandanna and have own traditional styles of headgear which are not called by the word hijab.
In the 1920s during the Soviet era, a series of policies and actions taken by the Communist Party of the Soviet Union, initiated by Joseph Stalin, to remove all manifestations of gender inequality, especially on the systems of female veiling and seclusion practiced in Central Asia.

In 2017, the government of Tajikistan passed a law requiring people to "stick to traditional national clothes and culture", which has been widely seen as an attempt to prevent women from wearing Islamic clothing, in particular the style of headscarf wrapped under the chin, in contrast to the traditional Tajik headscarf tied behind the head. Tajik authorities have reportedly enforced this with warnings, fines, sacking from employment, or refusal of services in hospitals and schools.

Tunisia

During the struggle for national independence, Habib Bourguiba favored the traditional Tunisian hijab, the sefsari, because it was seen as a symbol of preservation of the Tunisian cultural identity against the French culture colonialism; after independence however, President Habib Bourguiba promoted modernity and gender equality through the National Union of Tunisian Women (UNFT), and rejected the veil as a symbol of backwardness. 
In a public ceremony in 1956, the President, surrounded by women political associates, gently and ceremonially removed the veil from the head of a woman in a symbolic gesture of rejection of its use.  
By the 1980s, the only Tunisian urban women wearing the veil were reportedly women members of the Islamic Tendency Movement (MTI).

In 1981, women with headscarves were banned from schools and government buildings, and since then those who insist on wearing them face losing their jobs. In 2006, the authorities launched a campaign against the hijab, banning it in some public places, where police would stop women on the streets and ask them to remove it, and warn them not to wear it again. The government described the headscarf as a sectarian form of dress which came uninvited to the country.

, after the Tunisian revolution took place, the headscarf ban was lifted; however, in contemporary urban Tunisian society it is still not fully accepted. On 6 July 2019 the government banned the wearing of the niqab in public institutions citing security reasons.

Turkey

Mustafa Kemal, had ambition to make Turkey a new modern Secular nation. In 1925, he removed Islam from the constitution and introduced a new Family Law modelled after the Swiss Family Law, and in the same year, he banned the traditional hat for men, the fez.  
Mustafa Kemal viewed modern clothing as an essential visual symbol of the new Secular nation and encouraged both women and men to wear modern fashion, but in contrast to his law against traditional wear for men, he never introduced a ban against the hijab. 
However, he appeared in public with his wife Latife Uşaki unveiled, and arranged formal state receptions with dinner and dance where men and women could mingle, to encourage women to leave seclusion and adopt modern clothing, and in the mid-1920s, upper- and middle class Turkish women started to appear unveiled in public.

Turkey is officially a secular state, and the hijab was banned in universities and public buildings from 1981 until late 2013; this included libraries or government buildings. The ban was first in place during the 1980 military coup, but the law was strengthened in 1997. There has been some unofficial relaxation of the ban under governments led by the conservative Justice and Development Party (AKP) in recent years: for example, the current government of the AKP is willing to lift the ban in universities. However, the new law was upheld by the constitutional court.

Some researchers claim that about 55 to 60 percent of Turkish women cover their heads. A number of women wear a headscarf for cultural reasons; that cultural headscarf is used by women that work under the sun to protect their heads from sunburn. In cities like Istanbul and Ankara about a half of women cover their heads. In the cities in eastern Turkey, more women cover their heads.

On 7 February 2008, the Turkish Parliament passed an amendment to the constitution, allowing women to wear the headscarf in Turkish universities, arguing that many women would not seek an education if they could not wear the hijab. The decision was met with powerful opposition and protests from secularists. On 5 June 2008, the Constitutional Court of Turkey reinstated the ban on constitutional grounds relating to the secularity of the state. Headscarves had become a focal point of the conflict between the ruling Justice and Development Party (AKP) and the secularist establishment. The ruling was widely seen as a victory for Turks who claim this maintains Turkey's separation of state and religion. In 2013, the headscarf ban in public institutions was lifted through a decree, even though the ban officially stands through court decisions. The ban on wearing hijab in high schools ended in 2014.

In March 2017, the Ministry of Defence in Ankara announced a change in rules to allow women in the armed forces to wear headscarves with their uniforms, which sparked concerns from secularists over creeping Islamisation of the military.

In October 2022, Turkey's government and opposition both pledged legal steps to establish women's right to wear Islamic headscarves, bringing an issue that previously caused severe splits back to the forefront of political discourse ahead of following year's elections.The recommendations came as President Recep Tayyip Erdogan's governing AK Party and the opposition pushed policy ideas ahead of 2023 Turkish presidential election, with an eye on opinion surveys that show the outcome is still in doubt.

United Arab Emirates

There are no law banning or mandating veiling in the United Arab Emirates. 

In practice however women are expected to dress defined as "modest" and it is common for Emirati women to wear abaya and cover their head with a hijab or shayla, although the traditional face cover known as battoulah became less common in the 21st-century.

Uzbekistan 

The word "hijab" was used only for certain style of hijab, and such style of hijab was not commonly worn by Muslims there until the fall of the Soviet Union. Some Islamic adherents (like Uzbeks) used to wear the paranja, while others (Chechens, Kara-Chai, Tajiks, Kazakhs, Turkmens, etc.) wore traditional scarves the same way as a bandanna and have own traditional styles of headgear which are not called by the word hijab.
In the 1920s during the Soviet era, a series of policies and actions taken by the Communist Party of the Soviet Union, initiated by Joseph Stalin, to remove all manifestations of gender inequality, especially on the systems of female veiling and seclusion practiced in Central Asia.

Uzbek authorities in 2012 reportedly prohibited the selling of religious clothing, specifically hijabs and face veil, at several Tashkent markets following a secretive ban on their sales. An Uzbek imam was sacked in 2018 after he urged President Shavkat Mirziyoyev to lift a ban on personal religious symbols including hijabs.

Yemen 
In 1956 the Adeni Women's Club engaged in favor of unveiling on the initiative of Radhia Ihsan, when six unveiled women, followed by about thirty unveiled women by car, attended a procession through the streets of Aden to the office of the news papers al-Ayyam and Fatat al-jazira, were they issued a press statement condemning the veil as a hindrance against the participation of women in public society.  After the foundation of the People's Democratic Republic of Yemen in 1967, the General Union of Yemeni Women supported unveiling and women's rights in all spheres, though the policies they introduced in South Yemen was reversed after the Yemeni Unification in the 1990s.

Although there is no dress code that legally forces veiling upon women in Yemen, the abaya and niqab are social norms in Yemen and are worn by girls from a young age. In some areas, the hijab is part of school uniforms. Yemeni women who choose to not wear headscarves are at risk of oppression.

When Nobel Peace Laureate Tawakkol Karman was asked by journalists about her hijab with regard to her intellect and education, she replied, "man in early times was almost naked, and as his intellect evolved he started wearing clothes. What I am today and what I'm wearing represents the highest level of thought and civilization that man has achieved, and is not regressive. It's the removal of clothes again that is regressive back to ancient times."

Africa

Cameroon
On 12 July 2015, two women dressed in religious garments blew themselves up in Fotokol, killing 13 people. Following the attacks, since 16 July, Cameroon banned the wearing of full-face veils, including the burqa, in the Far North region. Governor Midjiyawa Bakari of the mainly Muslim region said the measure was to prevent further attacks.

Chad 
Following a double suicide bombing on 15 June 2015 which killed 33 people in N'Djamena, the Chadian government announced on 17 June 2015 the banning of the wearing of the burqa in its territory for security reasons. The 2015 prime minister, Kalzeube Pahimi Deubet, called the burqa "camouflage." Women who violate this ban are subject to jail time.

Congo-Brazzaville
The full-face veil was banned in May 2015 in public places in Congo-Brazzaville to "counter terrorism", although there has not been an Islamist attack in the country.

Gabon
On 15 July 2015, Gabon announced a ban on the wearing of full-face veils in public and places of work because of the attacks in Cameroon.

Oceania

Australia

In September 2011, Australia's most populous state, New South Wales, passed the Identification Legislation Amendment Act 2011 to require a person to remove a face covering if asked by a state official. The law is viewed as a response to a court case of 2011 where a woman in Sydney was convicted of falsely claiming that a traffic policeman had tried to remove her niqab.

The debate in Australia is more about when and where face coverings may legitimately be restricted. In a Western Australian case in July 2010, a woman sought to give evidence in court wearing a niqab. The request was refused on the basis that the jury needs to see the face of the person giving evidence.

East and Southeast Asia

China

In 2017, China banned the burqa in the Islamic area of Xinjiang. Photographer Fiona Reilly documented her interactions in 2019 with headscarf-clad Uyghur women in Kashgar.

Myanmar
At a conference in Yangon held by the Organization for the Protection of Race and Religion on 21 June 2015, a group of monks locally called Ma Ba Tha declared that the headscarves "were not in line with school discipline", recommending the Burmese government to ban the wearing of hijabs by Muslim schoolgirls and to ban the butchering of animals on the Eid holiday.

Philippines

Philippine law recognizes the right of Muslim women to wear headscarves including the hijab. The Commission on Human Rights issued on CHR Advisory number 2013–002 on 8 August 2013, that its Gender Ombud affirms the human rights of Muslim women to wear hijab, burka, and niqabs as part of their freedom of expression and freedom of religion as a response to schools implementing a ban on wearing the headscarves. It cited the Magna Carta of Women, particularly Section 28 which states that "the state shall recognize and respect the rights of Moro and indigenous women to practice, promote, protect, and preserve their own culture, traditions, and institutions and to consider these rights in the formulation and implementation of national policies and programs."

The Armed Forces of the Philippines, Philippine Coast Guard, and Philippine National Police, and the Bureau of Jail Management and Penology allows its female Muslim personnel to wear headscarves as part of their official uniform.

South Asia

India
In India, Muslim women are allowed to wear the hijab and/or burqa anytime, anywhere. However, in November 2017, a Catholic school in Uttar Pradesh's Barabanki district allegedly barred two Muslim students from wearing the headscarf inside the campus.
In April 2019, Shiv Sena party member Sanjay Raut called for the burka to be banned.

In May 2019, the Muslim Educational Society in Kerala banned its students from wearing face-covering attire.

In February 2020, Uttar Pradesh's labor minister Raghuraj Singh has called for an outright ban on women wearing burqas, suggesting that terrorists have been using them to elude authorities.

Karnataka hijab controversy 

In January 2022, a number of colleges in South-Indian state of Karnataka stopped female students wearing hijab from entering the campus. The issue has since then snow-balled into a major political controversy in India. Although there is no particular law stating the ban on hijab or any other kind of Islamic veil/dress in Karnataka, educational institutions have the right to make their own dress code. On 5 February 2022, the Karnataka government issued an order clarifying that uniforms must be worn compulsorily where policies exist and no exception can be made for the wearing of hijab. Several schools cited this order and denied entry to Muslim girls wearing the hijab. War of words and protests by Muslim students protesting over hijab ban resulted in closure of all educational institutions in the state for three days and section 144 was declared near schools and colleges in Bengaluru city. On 15 March 2022, through a verdict, the Karnataka High Court upheld the hijab ban in educational institutions as a non essential part of Islam and  suggested that wearing hijabs can be restricted in government colleges where uniforms are prescribed and ruled that " prescription of a school uniform " is a "reasonable restriction".

Sri Lanka
A Sri Lankan MP called for both burqa and niqab to be banned from the country in wake of the Easter terror attack which happened on 21 April 2019 during a local parliamentary session.

The Sri Lankan government banned all types of clothing covering the face, including the burqa and niqab, on 29 April 2019.

North America

Canada

On 12 December 2011, the Canadian Minister of Citizenship and Immigration issued a decree banning the niqab or any other face-covering garments for women swearing their oath of citizenship; the hijab was not affected. This edict was later overturned by a Court of Appeal on the grounds of being unlawful.

Mohamed Elmasry, a controversial former president of the Canadian Islamic Congress (CIC), has claimed that only a small minority of Muslim Canadian women actually wear these types of clothing. He has also said that women should be free to choose, as a matter of culture and not religion, whether they wear it. The CIC criticized a proposed law that would have required voters to show their faces before being allowed to cast ballots. The group described the idea as unnecessary, arguing that it would only promote discrimination against Muslims and provide "political mileage among Islamophobes".

In February 2007, soccer player Asmahan Mansour, part of the team Nepean U12 Hotspurs, was expelled from a Quebec tournament for wearing her headscarf. Quebec soccer referees also ejected an 11-year-old Ottawa girl while she was watching a match.

In November 2013, a bill commonly referred to as the Quebec Charter of Values was introduced in the National Assembly of Quebec by the Parti Québécois that would ban overt religious symbols in the Quebec public service. Thus would include universities, hospitals, and public or publicly funded schools and daycares. Criticism of this decision came from The Globe and Mail newspaper, saying that such clothing, as worn by "2011 Nobel Peace Prize winner Tawakkul Karman", was "Good enough for Nobel, but not for Quebec". In 2014 however, the ruling Parti Québécois was defeated by the Liberal Party of Quebec and no legislation was enacted regarding religious symbols.

In October 2017, Bill 62, a Quebec ban on face covering, made headlines. , the ban has been suspended by at least two judges for violating the Canadian Charter of Rights and Freedoms. It was first suspended in December 2017.

With regards to public opinion, a 27 October 2017 Ipsos poll found that 76 percent of Quebecers backed Bill 62, with 24 percent opposing it. The same survey found the 68 percent of Canadians in general supported a law similar to Bill 62 in their part of Canada. A 27 October Angus Reid Institute poll found that 70 percent Canadians outside of Quebec supported "legislation similar to Bill 62" where they lived in the country, with 30 percent opposing it.

, wearing religious symbols is prohibited for all public servants in positions of authority in Quebec: police, judges and teachers.

People such as Tarek Fatah and Ensaf Haidar have called on the burka to be banned.

Mexico

There is no ban on any Muslim clothing items. The first article of the Political Constitution of the United Mexican States protects people against discrimination based on several matters including religion, ethnic origin and national origin. Article 6 of the Constitution grants Libertad de Expresión (freedom of expression) to all Mexicans which includes the way people choose to dress.

The Muslim community is a minority; according to the Pew Forum on Religion and Public Life there were about 3,700 Muslims in Mexico as of 2010, representing 0.003 percent of the total population. There is an almost complete lack of knowledge of Islam in Mexico, and any interest is more out of curiosity and tolerance than hatred or racism. Some Muslims suggest that it is easier to fit in if they are lax with the rules of their religion, for example by wearing regular clothing. Muslim women's clothing can vary from non-Muslim clothing to a hijab or a chador.

United States

Hijab is commonly worn by Muslim women in the United States, and is a very distinctive cultural feature of Muslims in America. According to a Pew Research Center poll from 2011, 36% of Muslim American women reported wearing hijab whenever they were in public, with an additional 24% indicating they wore it most or some of the time, while only 40% indicated that they never wore the headcover. Contrary to popular beliefs about assimilation, the study found that the number of women wearing hijab was in fact higher among native-born Muslim women compared to first-generation Muslim immigrants. In the 1990s, however, hijabs were not commonly seen in the United States, as overt Islamization became more apparent only during the 21st century.

The people of the United States have a firm constitutional protection of freedom of speech from government interference that includes clothing items, as described by Supreme Court cases such as Tinker v. Des Moines. As such, a ban on Islamic clothing is considered presumptively invalid by US sociopolitical commentators such as Mona Charen of National Review. Journalist Howard LaFranchi of The Christian Science Monitor has referred to "the traditional American respect for different cultural communities and religions under the broad umbrella of universal freedoms" as forbidding the banning of Islamic dress. In his prominent June 2009 speech to the Muslim World in Cairo, President Barack Obama called on the West "to avoid dictating what clothes a Muslim woman should wear" and elaborated that such rules involve "hostility" towards Muslims in "the pretense of liberalism".

Most gyms, fitness clubs, and other workout facilities in the United States are mixed-sex, so exercise without a hijab or burqa can be difficult for some observant Muslim women. Maria Omar, director of media relations for the Islamic Food and Nutrition Council of America (IFANCA), has advised Muslim women to avoid these complexes entirely. Some women decide to wear something colloquially known as the "sports hijab". Similarly, Muslim women may feel uncomfortable around other women with traditionally revealing American outfits, especially during the summer "bikini season". An outfit colloquially known as the burqini allows Muslim women to swim without displaying any significant amount of skin.

Despite perceptions of social discrimination against Muslim women, there are no legal restrictions on Islamic modesty garb in the United States, due to universal religious freedom protections in American law. For example, the Supreme Court of the United States ruled against Abercrombie and Fitch when they refused to hire a woman named Samantha Elauf on account of her wearing hijab, stating that the dress code policy violated Elauf's religious freedom. Compared to Western Europe, there have thus been relatively few controversies surrounding the hijab in everyday life as multiculturalism and overt display of faith is more accepted in the United States for long-standing cultural and political reasons.

In January 2017, the New Jersey Superior Court, Appellate Division in Camden County dismissed two suits filed by Linda Tisby in summer 2015 against her former employer, the county's Department of Corrections. The court decided that a New Jersey Superior Court was right to rule that it would have been an "undue hardship" for the agency to accommodate her religious beliefs "because of overriding safety concerns, the potential for concealment of contraband, and the importance of uniform neutrality".

See also

 Hijabophobia
 Women in Islam
 Islam in Europe
 Islamic dress in Europe
 Clothing laws by country
 Multiculturalism

References

Sources
 Scott, Joan Wallach (2007). "The Politics of the Veil". Princeton University Press.

External links

 Burqa ban: What it means for the West – TCN News
 VEIL Project – Values, Equality and Differences in Liberal Democracies. Debates about Muslim Headscarves in Europe (University of Vienna)
 Q&A: Muslim headscarves from BBC News
 Shabina Begum case: School wins Muslim dress appeal (22 March 2006)
 The Veil and the British Male Elite
Wholeasale turkish hijab fashion
History of Asian clothing
Hijab
Islamic female clothing
Islamism
Islamic extremism
Religious fundamentalism
Islamic fundamentalism
Multiculturalism
Immigration
Misogyny
Theocracy
Modesty
Wahhabism
Pan-Islamism
Women's clothing
Globalization
Sexism